Chen Shi-shuenn is a Taiwanese engineer and politician. He has been the Minister of the Public Construction Commission (PCC) of the Executive Yuan since 22 October 2013.

Education
Chen holds a bachelor's degree in civil engineering from National Taiwan University, a master's degree in civil engineering from University of Delaware and a doctoral degree in civil engineering from the University of California, Berkeley in the United States.

Early career
He was a professor of construction engineering at National Taiwan University of Science and Technology.

Political career
In 1995–1996, Chen was the Deputy Director-General of the National Expressway Engineering Bureau of the Ministry of Transportation and Communications. In 1999–2001, he was the member of Disaster Prevention and Safety Committee of the Ministry of the Interior. In 2005–2009, he was the member of Public Construction Commission.

References

Living people
Political office-holders in the Republic of China on Taiwan
National Taiwan University alumni
University of Delaware alumni
UC Berkeley College of Engineering alumni
Year of birth missing (living people)
Taiwanese civil engineers
Presidents of universities and colleges in Taiwan
Academic staff of the National Taiwan University of Science and Technology